Paulina Brodd (born 8 August 1994) is a Swedish model and beauty pageant titleholder who was crowned Miss Universe Sweden 2015. She represented her country at the Miss Universe 2015 pageant.

Personal life
Brodd was born in Stockholm and currently works as a model. Her mother Monica Brodd was Miss Sweden 1992 and placed in the Top 10 of Miss Universe 1992, held in Bangkok.

Brodd was a contestant on Robinson: Love Edition which was broadcast on Sjuan in 2015.

Miss Sweden 2015
Brodd was crowned as Miss Sweden 2015 (Miss Universe Sweden 2015) on 19 July 2015.

Miss Universe 2015
Brodd competed at the Miss Universe 2015 pageant on December 20, 2015.

References

External links

Living people
Swedish beauty pageant winners
Swedish female models
1994 births
Miss Universe 2015 contestants